Valorphin, also known as VV-hemorphin-5, is a naturally occurring, endogenous opioid heptapeptide of the hemorphin family with the amino acid sequence H-Val-Val-Tyr-Pro-Trp-Thr-Gln-OH (VVYPWTQ). It is produced in the body via proteolyic cleavage of residues 33-39 of the β-chain of hemoglobin. Valorphin binds preferentially to the μ-opioid receptor and produces effects such as analgesia and self-administration in animals. It also possesses cytotoxic and antiproliferative properties against tumor cells, the mediation of which, because they are reversed by naloxone, appears to be dependent on the opioid receptors.

See also 
 Hemorphin

References 

Opioid peptides